Akubōzu is a yōkai from Akita Prefecture and Iwate Prefecture. It is said that they live in the ash of the hearth in Senboku-gun and Ogatsu-gun in Akita prefecture, and appear when they play with the ash.

Analogy
In the Tohoku region, there are many traditions that youkai appear when you play with ashes. In Ninohe-gun, Iwate, those who play with the ashes of the furnace are said to be drawn into the ashes by a monster called "Amanesaku" and eaten.  There is a theory that this is a genie, and the one that emerges from the furnace in some parts of Fukushima Prefecture is called "Amanjak". Also, according to Kunio Yanagida's book, Tono Monogatari, a ghost called "Boko" appears in the Tono region when digging furnace ash.

References

Mythological monsters
Yōkai